Apoquitaua River is a river of Amazonas state in north-western Brazil. It is located east of the Madeira River and south of the Amazon River. It is connected to both these, as well as several other smaller rivers, via the Paraná Urariá channel.

See also
List of rivers of Amazonas

References
Brazilian Ministry of Transport

Rivers of Amazonas (Brazilian state)